Pırnarlı Island (also called Pınarlı Ada) is an island in İzmir Gulf of Turkey. It is one of a group of 12 islands in the gulf. The name of the island refers to the plant Holly which is plentiful in the island. But the island is popularly called  Pınarlı which means "with springs"

References

Islands of Turkey
Islands of İzmir Province
Urla District
Aegean islands
Gulf of İzmir